Stadionul Bucegi is a multi-purpose stadium in Râșnov, Romania. It is currently used mostly for football matches, is the home ground of Olimpic Cetate Râșnov and holds 3,000 people (600 on seats).

References

External links
Stadionul Bucegi at soccerway.com

Football venues in Romania
Sport in Brașov County
Buildings and structures in Brașov County